Noyant-Villages is a commune in the Maine-et-Loire department of western France. The municipality was established on 15 December 2016 and consists of the former communes of Auverse, Breil, Broc, Chalonnes-sous-le-Lude, Chavaignes, Chigné, Dénezé-sous-le-Lude, Genneteil, Lasse, Linières-Bouton, Meigné-le-Vicomte, Méon, Noyant and Parçay-les-Pins.

Population
The population data given in the table below refer to the commune in its geography as of January 2020.

See also 
Communes of the Maine-et-Loire department

References 

Communes of Maine-et-Loire